The 1907 North Dakota Agricultural Aggies football team was an American football team that represented North Dakota Agricultural College (now known as North Dakota State University) as an independent during the 1907 college football season.  In its second and final season under head coach Gil Dobie, the team compiled a 3–0 record and outscored opponents by a total of 164 to 10.

The season was part of a 10-game winning streak that began in 1905 and ended in 1908.

Schedule

References

North Dakota Agricultural
North Dakota State Bison football seasons
College football undefeated seasons
North Dakota Agricultural Aggies football